Loma (Loghoma, Looma, Lorma) is a Mande language spoken by the Loma people of Liberia and Guinea.

Dialects of Loma proper in Liberia are Gizima, Wubomei, Ziema, Bunde, Buluyiema.

In Liberia, the people and language are also known as "Bouze" (Busy, Buzi), which is considered offensive.

Writing systems
Today, Loma uses a Latin-based alphabet which is written from left to right. A syllabary saw limited use in the 1930s and 1940s in correspondence between Loma-speakers, but today has fallen into disuse.

Sample
The Lord's Prayer in Loma:

Hymns 
In the 1960s several hymns composed in Loma by Billema Kwillia were recorded by the missionary Margaret D. Miller and then adopted by the Lutheran Church, first appearing in print in Loma in 1970. The most widely used, 'A va de laa' was not translated to singable English until 2004; it is also translated to German.

References

Bibliography 
 Rude, Noel. 1983. Ergativity and the active-stative typology in Loma. Studies in African Linguistics, 14:265–283.
 Sadler, Wesley. 1951. Untangled Loma: a course of study of the Looma language of the Western Province, Liberia, West Africa. Published by Board of Foreign Missions of the United Lutheran Church in America for the Evangelical Lutheran Church in Liberia.

External links
 ISO proposal for Looma 'macrolanguage'

Mande languages
Languages of Liberia
Languages of Guinea
Languages written in Latin script